Castelmoron-d'Albret is a commune in the Gironde department in Nouvelle-Aquitaine in south-western France.

It is notable for being the smallest commune in France by size, with an area of just , roughly the size of the Place Charles de Gaulle in Paris. It is the smallest Commune in France, and is smaller than the nations of Monaco and Vatican City.

Population

See also
Communes of the Gironde department

References

Communes of Gironde